Sheena Elizabeth Radford  FRS FMedSci is a British biophysicist, and Astbury Professor of Biophysics in the Astbury Centre for Structural Molecular Biology, School of Molecular and Cellular Biology at the University of Leeds. Radford is the Associate Editor of the Journal of Molecular Biology.

Education
Radford received her BSc in Biochemistry at the University of Birmingham in 1984, and her PhD in Biochemistry at the University of Cambridge in 1987. Radford completed a post-doctoral fellowship at the University of Oxford.

Career and research
Radford worked as a Lecturer in Biochemistry and Molecular Biology at the University of Leeds in 1995, progressing to Reader in 1998 and Professor in 2000. She became the Deputy Director of the Astbury Centre for Structural Molecular Biology in 2009 then Director in 2012. Radford's research investigates protein folding, protein aggregation and amyloid disease. Her multi-disciplinary research focuses include such disciplines as biochemistry, chemistry and medicine.

One major research focus is the role of protein misfolding in the onset of amyloidogenic diseases, including dialysis-related amyloidosis, Alzheimer's and Type II diabetes. This has been done with the use of native mass spectrometry, NMR and single molecule methods to characterize intermediates of protein folding and in amyloid formation. A second research focus is on the folding of outer membrane proteins of Gram-negative organisms. Understanding the mechanics of how these proteins fold will help derive new antibiotics.

In 2016, Radford received an Investigator Award in Science for Protein-protein interactions in the early stages of amyloid assembly mechanisms.

In 2020, a collaboration between scientists at the University of Leeds and AstraZeneca led to the development of a technique that, "allows fragments of antibodies to be screened for susceptibility to aggregation caused by structure disruption much earlier in the drug discovery process." Protein sequences hosted in bacterial cells that have shown resistance are harvested and their genes sequenced. Radford said that sequences will be uploaded to a database where advances in machine learning will eventually be able to identify patterns in protein sequences that can be scaled up for pharmaceutical production without needing any experiments.

In 2021, an advance in biomolecular design was the creation of new proteins that were shown in the lab to spontaneously fold into their intended structures and embed into lipid membranes as reported in Science with lead author Anastassia Vorobieva. Bacteria are encased in an outer membrane. Proteins in this outer membrane facilitate transport with the outside world. These proteins share a similar nanoscale structure, a transmembrane beta-barrel, through which other molecules can pass. Vorobieva and colleagues used molecular design software to draft possible structures. Radford's team tested whether these improved proteins would embed into artificial lipid membranes, finding that they could so efficiently without any accessory proteins. Radford said, "These designed proteins are interesting from a basic science perspective because they have no evolutionary history. By studying them, we can discover some of the essential features that enable transmembrane beta-barrel proteins to fold into a membrane."

Awards and honours

 1996, Biochemical Society Colworth Medal
 2005, Royal Society of Chemistry Astra-Zeneca prize in Proteins and Peptides
 2007, Elected member of EMBO
 2009, Ron Hites Award from the American Society for Mass Spectrometry (joint with Professor Alison Ashcroft)
 2010, Fellow of the Academy of Medical Sciences
 2013, Protein Society Carl Branden award
 2014, Honorary member of the British Biophysical Society 
 2015, Rita and John Cornforth Award of the Royal Society of Chemistry (joint with Professor Alison Ashcroft)
 2018, Fellow of the Biophysical Society 
 2020, Member of Academia Europaea 
 2020, Officer of the Most Excellent Oder of the British Empire (OBE)
 2021, Royal Society Professorship

Radford received the first Ron Hites award with Alison E. Ashcroft, and their coauthors for their paper, "Monitoring Co-populated Conformational States during Protein Folding Events using Electrospray Ionization-Ion Mobility Spectrometry-Mass Spectrometry" written by David P. Smith, Kevin Giles, Robert H. Bateman, Sheena E. Radford, and Alison E. Ashcroft. "The Ron Hites Award recognizes a high quality presentation of outstanding original research. Selection is based on a paper's innovative aspects, technical quality, likely stimulation of future research, likely impact on future applications, and quality of presentation. The Award is named in honor of Professor Ronald A. Hites of Indiana University, who led the creation of JASMS in 1988 while president of ASMS." Radford was elected a Fellow of the Royal Society (FRS) in 2014; her nomination reads:

Radford was elected a Fellow of the Academy of Medical Sciences (FMedSci) in 2010. Her nomination reads:

Radford is a member of Faculty of 1000.

Radford was appointed Officer of the Order of the British Empire (OBE) in the 2020 Birthday Honours for services to molecular biology research.

References

Living people
Fellows of the Royal Society
British biophysicists
Female Fellows of the Royal Society
Fellows of the Academy of Medical Sciences (United Kingdom)
Officers of the Order of the British Empire
Academics of the University of Leeds
Alumni of the University of Birmingham
Alumni of the University of Cambridge
Year of birth missing (living people)